Andrew Ness (born 1 October 1971) is a Scottish former rugby union player who played for Glasgow Warriors at the Flanker position.

In 1989 he played for Scotland Schools and was highlighted as having huge potential for senior rugby. At the time he was still in Dollar Academy.

He enlisted with Glasgow High Kelvinside that same year.

While at Strathclyde University studying for an MSc in Business Economics, Ness represented Scotland Students at the Rugby Students World Cup in 1992.

Glasgow High Kelvinside merged with Glasgow Academicals to form Glasgow Hawks in 1997. (Both original clubs still survive as spin-offs from the merger). From 1997 Ness then played for amateur club Glasgow Hawks.

The flanker was named in the professional provincial Glasgow squad for the season 1997-98

Ness played for Glasgow in their pre-season match against London Scottish on 10 August 1997. Although Glasgow lost the match 15 - 49, Ness scored a try.

Ness is now a Fund Manager for Global Emerging Markets. He is an associate of the UK Society of Investment Professionals (ASIP).

References

1971 births
Living people
People educated at Dollar Academy
Scottish rugby union players
Glasgow Warriors players
Glasgow Hawks players
Glasgow High Kelvinside RFC players
Alumni of the University of Strathclyde
Rugby union players from Clackmannanshire
Rugby union flankers